The Dargo River is a perennial river of the Mitchell River catchment, located in the Alpine and East Gippsland regions of the Australian state of Victoria.

Features and location
The river descends  over its  course.

Etymology

In the Aboriginal Dhudhuroa and Waywurru languages, the name dargo means "to have patience" or "to wait".

See also

Harrisons Cut gold diversion
List of rivers in Australia

References

External links
 
 

East Gippsland catchment
Rivers of Gippsland (region)
Rivers of Hume (region)
Victorian Alps